"Renegade" is a 1979 hit song recorded by the American rock band Styx on their Pieces of Eight album. Although songwriter Tommy Shaw and fellow Styx guitarist James Young usually played lead guitar on their own compositions, Shaw asked Young if he could take the solo on "Renegade". Young agreed, and Young later returned the favor by allowing Shaw to play lead on his "Half-Penny, Two-Penny" on the Paradise Theatre album. When performed live from 1978 to 1983, drummer John Panozzo increased the tempo of the drum pattern during the guitar solo sections. Also, the track would serve as the drum solo spot for Panozzo during that time frame.

Background
The song is a first-person narrative of an outlaw, captured for a bounty, who recognizes that he is about to be executed for his criminal activities.  The execution will be by hanging, as the outlaw laments, "Hangman is coming down from the gallows and I don't have very long." Some pressings of the single were made with translucent, red vinyl. Years after its release it remains a staple on classic rock radio playlists, and is usually the final song Styx plays at its concerts.

Reception
Cash Box said it "opens with delicate a cappella singing which suddenly breaks into powerful drum beat and rhythm guitar work." Record World called it a "story ballad with high harmony vocals and a strong rock track" and said that it had to be released as a single due to heavy AOR play.

Classic Rock critic Malcolm Dome rated "Renegade" as Styx 2nd best song, particularly praising Young's guitar solo.

Personnel
Tommy Shaw - lead vocals, rhythm guitar
Dennis DeYoung - keyboards, backing vocals
James "JY" Young - lead guitar, backing vocals
Chuck Panozzo - bass guitar
John Panozzo - drums

Chart history
"Renegade" reached #16 on the Billboard Hot 100 in June 1979.

Weekly charts

Year-end charts

In popular culture
The song is often used in media:
Freaks and Geeks, to evoke a '70s aesthetic  
S2Ep12 of Supernatural, when Sam and Dean escape capture by the FBI 
1995 movie Billy Madison 
Pittsburgh Steelers, between the 3rd and 4th quarters, especially during close games (started by the General Manager of the Hard Rock Cafe in Pittsburgh Rick Wittkopp)

References

External links
 

1978 songs
1979 singles
Songs written by Tommy Shaw
Styx (band) songs
A&M Records singles
Songs about death
Pittsburgh Steelers
Songs about criminals